The University of the South Pacific (USP) is a public research university with locations spread throughout a dozen countries in Oceania. Established in 1968, the university is organised as an intergovernmental organisation and is owned by the governments of 12 Pacific island countries: the Cook Islands, Fiji, Kiribati, Marshall Islands, Nauru, Niue, Samoa, Solomon Islands, Tokelau, Tonga, Tuvalu and Vanuatu.

USP is an international centre for teaching and research on Pacific culture and environment, with almost 30,000 students in 2017.

The university's main campus is in Suva, Fiji, with subsidiary campuses in each member state.

History
Discussion of a regional university for the South Pacific began in the early 1950's, when an investigation by the then-South Pacific Commission recommended the creation of a "central institution" for vocational training in the South Pacific, with a university college as a distant goal. In December 1962, the Fijian Legislative Assembly discussed establishing a university in Fiji. In 1964, New Zealand proposed the establishment of a regional teachers' training college in Suva. In 1965, the governments of Great Britain and New Zealand appointed a "Higher Education Mission to the South Pacific", chaired by Sir Charles Morris, to investigate "the future education requirements of the South Pacific area" and recommend the type of level of institutions needed. In 1966 the Mission reported back, recommending the establishment of "“fully autonomous university comprehending within itself, as well as Faculties of Arts and Science, the Fiji School of Medicine, the School of Agriculture in Fiji, a College for the education and training of secondary teachers, the Pacific Theological College, and, in so far its activities in the field of diploma courses are concerned, the Derrick Technical Institute". The Mission recommended that it be called the University of the South Pacific. The former Royal New Zealand Air Force seaplane base at Laucala Bay in Fiji was recommended as a suitable location. A subsequent report by Norman Alexander fleshed out the proposal, and in 1967 the Fijian government passed an ordinance establishing the university's interim council. In February 1970 this was replaced with a royal charter.

The university opened on 5 February 1968, with Colin Aikman as its first Vice-Chancellor. Initially teaching was limited to preliminary courses, the equivalent of New Zealand's School Certificate and University Entrance. Degree teaching began in 1969, with a school of natural resources, a school of education, and a school of social and economic development offering interdisciplinary courses. The first graduation ceremony took place on 2 December 1971, with 49 students receiving degrees, diplomas and certificates.

In the 1970s the university began establishing regional extension centres to deliver continuing education, correspondence and extramural courses. It also began to advocate for Pacific regionalism and adopt a distinct "Pacific flavour", with Vice-Chancellor James Maraj arguing that the university should become "truely a university of the peoples of the Pacific". In 1976 it established the Institute of Pacific Studies under Professor Ron Crocombe to deepen students' awareness of Pacific identity and the region. Over the next 20 years, the institute published work by over 2000 Pacific authors. A foundation course in Pacific studies is still included in every USP undergraduate programme.

In 1977 the government of Western Samoa leased the South Pacific Regional College of Tropical Agriculture in Alafua to the university to establish a school of agriculture. It is now the university's Alafua campus. In 1989 it opened the Emalus campus in Vanuatu, which since 1996 has hosted the university's law school and the Pacific Islands Legal Information Institute.

In 1991 the Republic of the Marshall Islands became the university's 12th member country. An extension campus was opened there in 1993.

In 2012 the university opened a Confucius Institute at the Laucula campus in partnership with the Beijing University of Posts and Telecommunications.

In 2017 the university supplemented its governance arrangements with the University of the South Pacific Convention, providing for the recognition of the university by its member-states. The convention came into force on 16 June 2018.

In 2018 the university celebrated its 50th anniversary.

Governance
The university is governed by a council, chaired by the pro-chancellor. The council consists of the ministers of education of member states, additional representatives from Fiji, Samoa, Australia and New Zealand, staff and student representatives, and additional members co-opted by the council. The titular head of the council is the chancellor, a position which rotates among the heads of state and heads of government of the university's members. An independent University Grants Committee meets every three years to advise member and donor countries on funding levels.

The following people have held the role of vice-chancellor:
 Colin Aikman (1968 – 1974)
 James Maraj (1975 – 1982)
 Frank Brosnahan (1982 – 1983)
 Geoffrey Caston (1983 – 1992)
 Esekia Solofa (1992 – 2001)
 Savenaca Siwatibau (2001 – 2003)
 Anthony Tarr (2005 – 2007)
 Rajesh Chandra (2007 – 2018)
 Pal Ahluwalia (2018 – )

Dispute with Fijian government
In 2019, Ahluwalia  raised concerns about  mismanagement and abuse of office at USP under the leadership of the previous Vice-Chancellor, Rajesh Chandra. An investigation by New Zealand accounting firm BDO substantiated the allegations, and the report was subsequently leaked online. In June 2020, a special council meeting led by Pro-Chancellor Winston Thompson suspended Ahluwalia for unspecified "misconduct". Staff protesting the suspension were questioned by Fijian police. On 19 June Ahluwalia was reinstated by a full meeting of the USP council, and the allegations against him were dismissed in September 2020.

The Fijian government refused to accept Ahluwalia's exoneration, and on 24 September 2020 halted all funding to the university. On 4 February 2021, the Fijian government summarily deported Ahluwalia for being "a person who is or has been conducting himself in a manner prejudicial to the peace, defence, public safety, public order, public morality, public health, security or good government of the Fiji Islands".  In response to Fiji government interference in the regional university, Samoa has proposed moving USP's headquarters to Samoa. Following Ahluwalia's deportation, Dr Giulio Masasso Tu'ikolongahau Paunga was appointed acting Vice-Chancellor by the USP Council, while Ahluwalia remains Vice-Chancellor pending moving his office to Nauru. The Council also established a subcommittee to investigate the deportation.

Following Ahluwalia's deportation, Samoan Prime Minister Sailele Malielegaoi announced that Samoa would be willing to provide a new home for the university. On 25 May the university's council issued a new three-year contract to Ahluwalia and relocate the Vice-Chancellor's office to the Alafua Campus in Apia, Samoa.

In August 2021 the Fijian government announced that it would not fund the university as long as Ahluwalia was vice-chancellor.

Following the 2022 Fijian general election, the new government led by Sitiveni Rabuka revoked the prohibition order on Ahluwalia and reinstated funding to USP. In March 2023 former Prime Minister Frank Bainimarama and former police commissioner Sitiveni Qiliho were charged with abuse of office for allegedly terminating the police investigation into the 2019 claims of financial mismanagement.

Rankings

The Times Higher Education World University Rankings ranked USP in 1000-1200th for 2022. The university claimed that this translated to being ranked in the top 10% of universities in the world, leading to criticism that they were exaggerating their ranking.

Campuses

Despite its multi-campus nature, the USP is not a university system. It is a single university with several branches across the Pacific Region. USP's Laucala campus in Fiji is the main campus of the University, also serving as its administrative centre.

USP's main campus, called Laucala, lies on Laucala Bay in Fiji's capital of Suva. It also has two other satellite campuses in Fiji: Labasa and Lautoka. The Alafua campus in Samoa hosts the School of Agriculture and Food Technology. The Emalus campus in Vanuatu is the location for the School of Law. The Nuku-alofa campus in Tonga is where the Institute for Education, directed by Seu'ula Johansson-Fua is based.

In addition, USP operates 11 regional centres based in Pacific islands countries. The region served by USP covers 33 million km2 of the Pacific Ocean, an area more than three times the size of Europe. In contrast, the total land mass of territories served corresponds to the area of Denmark. Populations of member countries vary from Tokelau with 1,500 people to Fiji with more than 900,000 people. (The population of the region is about 1.3 million.)

The following are the extension campuses of the university, aside from its campuses in Fiji, Samoa, and Vanuatu.

Faculties and courses
After undergoing a restructuring process in early 2021, USP is organized into eight main faculties that include the following disciplines: 
School of Accounting, Finance and Economics (SAFE)
Accounting & Finance
Economics
School of Business and Management (SBM)
Tourism & Hospitality Management
Management and Public Administration
Land Management & Development
Graduate School of Business
School of Information Technology, Engineering, Mathematics and Physics (STEMP)
Engineering and Physics
Computing, Information & Mathematical Science
School of Agriculture, Geography, Environment, Ocean and Natural Sciences (SAGEONS)
Agriculture & Food Technology
Biological & Chemical Sciences
Geography, Earth Science and Environment
Marine Studies
School of Law and Social Sciences (SoLaSS)
Law
Government, Development & International Affairs
Social Sciences
School of Pacific Arts, Communication and Education (SPACE)
Education
Language, Arts & Media
Oceania Centre for Arts, Culture & Pacific Studies
Pacific Centre for Environment and Sustainable Development (PACE-SD)
Pacific TAFE (PTAFE)
College of Foundation Studies
College of Continuing Vocational Education and Training (CVET). Among many other qualifications, the Diploma of Library and Information Services (Level 5) is available at this institution, a library technician qualification which is recognised in Australia as a paraprofessional library qualification.

Notable academics and staff

 Marjorie Crocombe – author
 Ron Crocombe – father of Pacific Studies
 Sitiveni Halapua – politician
 Epeli Hauʻofa – anthropologist/sociologist/social scientist
 Elisabeth Holland – climate scientist
 Brij Lal – historian
 Biman Prasad – politician
 Mahendra Reddy – politician
 Ganesh Chand – former politician
 Tupeni Baba – politician
 Virginia Tilley – political scientist

Notable alumni

USP has produced a number of graduates that have played important roles in the South Pacific region. Its alumni include Mark Brown, Prime Minister of the Cook Islands, Elizabeth Iro, WHO Chief Nursing Officer, Ludwig Scotty, former President of Nauru; Bikenibeu Paeniu, former Prime Minister of Tuvalu; ʻAkilisi Pōhiva, former Prime Minister of Tonga; Joe Natuman, former Prime Minister of Vanuatu; archaeologist Tarisi Vunidilo, Solomon Islands women's activist Alice Pollard and Tonga environmental scientist Netatua Pelesikoti.

See also
 List of universities in Polynesia

References

External links

Sources
 
 
 
Kessler, K.A. Anthropology at the University of the South Pacific: From past dynamics to present perceptions. Aust J Anthropol. 2021;32:33– 53. https://doi.org/10.1111/ taja.12388

 
Universities and colleges in Oceania
Members of the International Council for Science
Universities and colleges in Fiji
Universities and colleges in Kiribati
Universities and colleges in the Marshall Islands
Universities and colleges in Samoa
Universities and colleges in the Solomon Islands
Universities and colleges in Tonga
Universities and colleges in Tuvalu
Universities and colleges in Vanuatu
Educational institutions established in 1968
1968 establishments in Fiji
Members of the International Science Council